Past Life (Hebrew: החטאים) is a 2016 Israeli drama film written and directed by Avi Nesher and starring Nelly Tagar and Joy Rieger.  It is based on Baruch Milch's memoir Can Heaven Be Void?  The film is the first of Nesher's planned trilogy.

Plot

Two Israeli sisters, one a classical music composer and singer, and the other a budding journalist, try to find out what their father did during World War II in Poland, after a Polish woman runs up to one of them in a Berlin concert venue and calls her the daughter of a murderer.

Cast
Nelly Tagar as Nana Milch-Kotler
 as Sephi Milch
 as Baruch Milch
Evgenia Dodina as Lusia Milch
 as Jeremy Kotler
 as Thomas Zielinski
 as Agnieszka Zielinska

Reception
The film has a 79% rating on Rotten Tomatoes.  Glenn Kenny of RogerEbert.com awarded Past Life three stars.  Joseph Friar of The Victoria Advocate also gave Past Life three stars.  Peter Goldberg of Slant Magazine gave Past Life two and a half stars out of four.  Bruce Demara of the Toronto Star awarded the film three stars out of four.  Gayle MacDonald of The Globe and Mail gave the film two stars out of four.  Barbara VanDenburgh of The Arizona Republic awarded it two and a half stars out of five.  Mark Jenkins of The Washington Post gave it two stars out of four.

Diane Carlson of KDHX praised the performances of Tagar and Rieger writing that they "present their characters' contrasting personalities beautifully, sparring like real sisters."  Hannah Brown of The Jerusalem Post also praised Tagar and Riger: "All the actors do extraordinary work, but the standouts are Rieger and Tagar in the lead roles."  Ben Kenigsberg of The New York Times wrote a positive review, describing the film as "a page-turner that transforms into a clarion call: always compelling, but slightly stifled by noble intentions."  Kenneth Turan of the Los Angeles Times wrote a positive review: "Uneven but ultimately effective, convincing in mood and emotion despite its melodramatic plotting, Avi Nesher's Past Life is straight-ahead filmmaking heightened by a connection to a pervasive Israeli reality not often found on film."  Susan G. Cole of Now gave it a positive review and wrote "this is first-rate filmmaking, and the cast, especially Tagar, prickly yet tender, is very good."  Allan Hunter of Screen Daily gave the film a positive review and wrote "The initial set-up of Past Life feels clunky, but once we are back in Israel and the sisters reluctantly confront their dour, domineering father Baruch it settles into a more confident, convincing phase."  Alissa Simon of Variety also gave it a positive review, calling it "profoundly moving".

References

External links
 
 

2010s German-language films
Polish-language films
2010s Hebrew-language films
Israeli drama films
Films based on non-fiction books
Films directed by Avi Nesher
Orion Pictures films
Samuel Goldwyn Films films
2016 drama films
2010s English-language films
2016 multilingual films
Israeli multilingual films